Anne Mauduit de Fatouville, called Nolant de Fatouville, (17th-century, Rouen – 2 September 1715) was a 17th–18th century French playwright of the Comédie Italienne.

Works 
1682: Arlequin lingère du palais
1682: Arlequin Mercure galant
1682: La Matrone d'Éphèse ou Arlequin Grapignan
1683: Arlequin Protée
1684: Arlequin empereur dans la lune
1684: Arlequin Jason ou la toison d'or comique
1685: Colombine avocat pour et contre
1685: Isabelle médecin
1685: Arlequin chevalier du soleil
1687: Le Banqueroutier
1688: Le Marchand dupé
1689: Colombine femme vengée
1690: La Fille savante
1692: La Précaution inutile

Bibliography 
 Le Théâtre italien, recueilli par Évariste Gherardi, textes établis, présentés et annotés par Charles Mazouer, Paris, Société des textes français modernes, 1994 ISSN 0768-0821

Sources 
 Napoléon-Maurice Bernardin, La Comédie italienne en France et les théâtres de la foire et du boulevard (1570-1791), Paris, Revue bleue, 1902.

External links 
 Anne Mauduit de Fatouville on data.bnf.fr
 List of his plays on CÉSAR

17th-century French dramatists and playwrights
Writers from Rouen
Year of birth unknown
1715 deaths